The 6th Indiana Infantry Regiment was an infantry regiment from the State of Indiana that served in the Union Army during the American Civil War. This regiment was the senior Indiana regiment of the Civil War, as it was numbered first in sequence after the five Indiana volunteer regiments which had served in the Mexican–American War. The regiment was originally mustered-in for a three-month period of service between April and August 1861, but after its initial term of service had expired it was re-formed in September 1861 for a further three-year period, before being mustered out in September 1864.

Service
The companies of the 6th Indiana Volunteer Infantry were raised in different parts of the state and organized at Indianapolis, Indiana between April 22 and April 27, 1861. The companies' counties of origin included Jefferson, Bartholomew, Daviess, Howard, Henry, Jennings, Jackson, and Hamilton. The Regiment was officially mustered into United States service for a period of three months on April 25, 1861.

On the May 30, 1861, the regiment left Indianapolis, by way of Cincinnati, Ohio, for Grafton, Virginia (now West Virginia).  Sent on to the town of Webster, they arrived on June 2 and marched  that same night to Philippi. On the morning of June 3, the 6th Indiana participated in the Battle of Philippi, one of the first land battles of the Civil War. They later participated in the Rich Mountain Campaign.

The regiment mustered out of service on August 2, 1861. Among its line officers was Captain Jeremiah C. Sullivan, who would later rise to the rank of brigadier general.

The 6th Indiana Volunteer Infantry was re-enlisted for three year service from the original regiment at Madison, Indiana, on September 20, 1861, by Colonel Thomas Turpin Crittenden. The regiment subsequently fought in the Battle of Shiloh, the Battle of Stones River, the Battle of Chickamauga, and the Battle of Resaca. At the conclusion of its three-year enlistment, the regiment was mustered out of service on September 22, 1864. Soldiers of the regiment who had unexpired enlistments, and those who re-enlisted were transferred to 68th Indiana Infantry Regiment.

Total strength and casualties
The total strength of the 6th Indiana Infantry at the time of its organization in April 1861 was 782 men, including 37 commissioned officers. During its first three-month period of service, the regiment suffered no casualties in battle, but three enlisted men died of disease and one member of the regiment was captured by the enemy and later exchanged. After being mustered in as a three-year regiment, the unit lost a further nine officers and 116 enlisted men killed in battle or died of wounds, and a further two officers and 140 enlisted men who died of disease, for a total of 267 fatalities.

Commanders
 Colonel Thomas Turpin Crittenden
 Colonel Philemon P. Baldwin – killed in action at the Battle of Chickamauga
 Colonel Hagerman Tripp

Notes

See also

 List of Indiana Civil War regiments
 Indiana in the Civil War

References
 Dyer, Frederick H. (1959). A Compendium of the War of the Rebellion. New York and London. Thomas Yoseloff, Publisher. .
 Holloway, William R. (2004). Civil War Regiments From Indiana. eBookOnDisk.com Pensacola, Florida. .
 Terrell, W.H.H. (1867). The Report of the Adjutant General  of the State of Indiana. Containing Rosters for the Years 1861–1865, Volume 7. Indianapolis, Indiana. Samuel M. Douglass, State Printer.

Units and formations of the Union Army from Indiana
Military units and formations established in 1861
Military units and formations disestablished in 1861
Military units and formations disestablished in 1864
1864 disestablishments in Indiana
1861 establishments in Indiana